Ralph Bunner is a paralympic athlete from Germany competing mainly in category T54 wheelchair racing events.

Despite competing in five distances from 400m to marathon and the 4 × 100 m in the 2000 Summer Paralympics it was his part in the German 4 × 400 m team that won Ralph his Paralympic bronze medal.  He also competed at various distances in the following two paralympics, without any further medal success.

References

Paralympic athletes of Germany
Athletes (track and field) at the 2000 Summer Paralympics
Athletes (track and field) at the 2004 Summer Paralympics
Athletes (track and field) at the 2008 Summer Paralympics
Paralympic bronze medalists for Germany
Living people
Medalists at the 2000 Summer Paralympics
Year of birth missing (living people)
Paralympic medalists in athletics (track and field)
German male wheelchair racers
20th-century German people
21st-century German people